Saw Myat was duchess of Sagu from the 1360s to 1390s. She was a sister of King Swa Saw Ke of Ava, and grandmother of Queen Shin Bo-Me.

Ancestry
Saw Myat was descended from the Pagan royalty from both sides, and was a grandniece of King Thihathu of Pinya.

References

Bibliography
 

Pinya dynasty
Ava dynasty
14th-century Burmese women